Kodari is a small village located at the border with Tibet-China. The village is located at the end–point of the Arniko Highway, which connects Kodari with the capital city of Kathmandu. Kodari is a major border crossing from Nepal into the Tibet Autonomous Region.

Kodari is a part of Bhotekoshi rural municipality in Sindhupalchok District of Bagmati Province (previously Tatopani VDC of Bagmati Zone of Central Development Region; from 1990–2017). The other side is the town of Zhangmu (also known as Dram or Khasa in Nepali) located in Nyalam County, Shigatse Prefecture of the Tibet.

History
In ancient times, it was the starting point of a trans-Himalayan caravan route.  Newar traders headed north from Kodari and after crossing Kuti pass turned east to continue their journey across the Tibetan Plateau to Lhasa.
The construction of the  Kathmandu-Kodari Road during the 1963-67 period.  It was named Araniko Highway in Nepal and China National Highway 318 beyond.  As of 2011, Nepal is planning to expand it to six metalled lanes.
 
China  started building a railway in 2008 connecting Lhasa with Zhangmu on the Nepal-China border. It is an extension of the  Qinghai-Tibet Railway.

In 2012, China signed agreement with Nepal to make this one of six ports of entries between Nepal and China.

The April and May 2015 earthquakes essentially closed the route due to numerous landslides and boulders coming down, damaging roads in Nepal and Tibet (China). There was an evacuation and people have been slow to come back, and there is large reduction in trading. Chinese and Nepali officials met in December 2016 to discuss potential reopening of the port in 2017, which was blocked by progress of road construction. The checkpoint finally reopened on 29 May 2019. Due to the COVID-19 pandemic, the border closed until second week of June 2020, then closed again until further notice (likely thru 2021) due to a landslide since July 9, while also warning of lakeburst of Tso Lake.

Geography
On a clear day, the Himalayan chain is visible on both sides of the road.

Transport 
Kodari is just south of and above the Friendship Bridge border crossing where Araniko Highway becomes China National Highway 318 and immediately passes Zhangmu village in Nyalam County Shigatse Prefecture, Tibet Autonomous Region en route to Shigatse.  Before the earthquake, tourists traveling between Nepal and the Tibet make substantial use of this crossing, and there was also substantial trans-border trade.

Chinese trucks traveling on the Tibet-Nepal Friendship Highway offload goods at Zhangmu and transfer them to Nepalese trucks. Even though the drive between Kodari and Kathmandu is only four hours, the sourcing logistics and bureaucracy of cross-border trade takes around 2 weeks, as such in 2013 it takes each Nepalese truck almost half a month for a round trip.

Gallery

External links

References

Populated places in Sindhupalchowk District